Otpisani (Serbian Cyrillic: Отписани) is a famous Serbian TV series, that was very popular in former Yugoslavia, originally airing in 1974. Due to its popularity, Radio Television of Serbia has shown reruns of the series eleven times, the last rerun starting in 2015. The series has achieved something of a cult status among its audience and still attracts an estimated 3 million viewers with its last rerun.

Idea of series derives from exploits of freedom fighters in Belgrade during World War II, and all the characters and events are fictitious.

Main cast
 Dragan Nikolić – Prle
 Vojislav Brajović – Tihi
 Zlata Petković – Marija
 Pavle Vujisić – Joca
 Čedomir Petrović – Zriki
 Vladan Holec – Mile 
 Stevo Žigon – Sturmbannführer Krüger
 Rudolf Ulrich – Standartenführer Müller
 Aleksandar Berček – Čibi / Mrki
 Dragomir Felba – Striko
 Rade Marković – Milan
 Slobodan Aligrudić – Skale
 Ivan Bekjarev – Cane Kurbla
 Miroljub Lešo – Slavko
 Dušan Perković – Nikola
 Vasa Pantelić – Krsta Mišić
 Predrag Milinković – Gojko
 Mihajlo Janketić – Vladimir

See also
 Potpisani - parody

External links

 Otpisani - Uvodna spica (YouTube) - theme song

World War II television drama series
Yugoslav drama television series
Radio Television of Serbia original programming
1974 Yugoslav television series debuts
1975 Yugoslav television series endings
Serbian drama television series
Serbian-language television shows
1970s Yugoslav television series
Television shows set in Belgrade
Television shows filmed in Belgrade
Fictional Yugoslav Partisans